Henry Dwight may refer to:

Henry Otis Dwight (1843–1917), American missionary
Henry W. Dwight (1788–1845), U.S. Representative from Massachusetts

See also
Henry Dwight Sedgwick, American lawyer and author